Helophilina is a subtribe of rat-tail maggot flies in the family Syrphidae. There are about 19 genera and more than 180 described species in Helophilina.

Genera
These 19 genera belong to the subtribe Helophilina:

 Anasimyia Schiner, 1864
 Arctosyrphus Frey, 1918
 Asemosyrphus Bigot, 1882
 Austrophilus Thompson, 2000
 Chasmomma Bezzi, 1915
 Dolichogyna Macquart, 1842
 Eurimyia Bigot, 1883
 Habromyia Williston, 1888
 Helophilus Fabricius, 1805 (marsh flies)
 Lejops Rondani, 1857
 Lunomyia Curran & Fluke, 1926
 Lycopale Hull, 1944
 Mallota Meigen, 1822 (mimic flies)
 Mesembrius Rondani, 1857
 Myathropa Rondani, 1845
 Ohmyia Thompson, 1999
 Parhelophilus Girschner, 1897 (bog flies)
 Polydontomyia Williston, 1896
 Quichuana Knab, 1913

References

External links

 

Eristalinae